This is a list of seasons played by Livingston F.C. in Scottish and European football. The club was first formed in Edinburgh as Ferranti Thistle in the 1940s, becoming Meadowbank Thistle and joining the Scottish Football League in 1974. The club relocated to Livingston in 1995, changing their name again and taking up residence in a new stadium in the West Lothian town.

Seasons

As Ferranti Thistle / Meadowbank Thistle

As Livingston

League performance summary 
The Scottish Football League was founded in 1890 and, other than during seven years of hiatus during World War II, the national top division has been played every season since. The following is a summary of Livingston's divisional status since 1953 when they joined the East of Scotland League as Ferranti Thistle:

66 total eligible seasons (including 2019–20)
7 seasons in top level
20 seasons in second level
17 seasons in third level
2 seasons in fourth level
20 seasons not involved – before club was league member

References

Sources
Soccerbase
FitbaStats
Football Club History Database (Ferranti Thistle)
Football Club History Database (Meadowbank Thistle)
Football Club History Database (Livingston)

Seasons
 
Livingston
Seasons